Alstom Transport Deutschland, formerly Linke-Hofmann-Busch, is a German manufacturing company originally established in Breslau (now Wrocław, Poland) to produce locomotives and rolling stock. Its origins lay in the wheelwright business of Gottfried Linke, begun in 1834. After World War II, the company was reestablished in Salzgitter in West Germany. In 1994, GEC Alsthom acquired a 51% shareholding. It is now part of Alstom; the name Linke-Hofmann-Busch ceased to be used in 2009 when it became Alstom Transport Deutschland GmbH.

Aircraft industry
During World War I, it became one of many companies in Germany drawn into the aircraft industry even though they had no prior experience in aircraft design.

Linke-Hofmann-Busch first entered the aircraft industry by repairing and constructing aircraft designed by other established companies under licence, such as the Roland C.IIa, Albatros B.IIa, C.III and C.X. In 1916 Linke-Hofmann-Busch was awarded a contract to design and build a four-engined heavy bomber under the Riesenflugzeug ("giant aircraft") designation.
Two designs were built in prototype form, the R.I and the R.II; both designs were unconventional. The R.I was unsuccessful, but the Linke-Hofmann R.II flew well. However, the war ended before it could go into production. Post-war attempts to build R.II's as passenger and transport aircraft were prevented by the Allied Control Commission which was concerned about bombers being built illicitly, under the guise of airliners, and the possible resumption of the war.

Rail products

Heavy Rail
Prototype carriages for the Deutsche Bundesbahn (1976).

Indian Railways' LHB coach are based on a design developed by Linke-Hofmann-Busch.

Suburban Rail
Litra SA and Litra SE for the Copenhagen S-tog (with Siemens, 1996–2006)
CIÉ 8100 Class for the Dublin Area Rapid Transit (with GEC, 1983–1984): built to a metro-style specification.
DB Class 420 for S-Bahn services in Munich, Rhine-Main, Rhine-Ruhr, and Stuttgart.

Metro
M1, M2 and M3 series for the Amsterdam Metro (1973–1980)
DT2 series for the Hamburg U-Bahn (with Kiepe).
DT4 series for the Hamburg U-Bahn (with ABB).

Light Rail
TT Class 8 for the Trondheim Tramway (1984)
P86 Stock for the Docklands Light Railway in East London (1986)
TW 2000 for the Hanover Stadtbahn (1997–2000)

See also
Pafawag, former Linke-Hofmann factory in Wroclaw (Breslau) nationalised in 1945

References

The German Giants, The Story of the R-planes 1914-1919, G.W Haddow & Peter M. Grosz, 1963. Published by Putnam & Company 42 Great Russell Street London

External links

Alstom
Companies based in Wrocław
Defunct aircraft manufacturers of Germany
Locomotive manufacturers of Germany